Robert Tyrone Reives II (born September 24, 1970) is an American politician from North Carolina. Originally an Attorney from Sanford, North Carolina, Reives was first appointed to the North Carolina House of Representatives in January 2014 and he has subsequently been re-elected 4 times, most recently in 2020. A Democrat, he represents the 54th district which includes all of Chatham County and parts of Durham County (formerly all of Chatham County and part of Lee County). In December 2020, Reives was elected by his peers as the House Democratic leader.

Early life 
Robert Reives grew up and attended schools in Sanford, North Carolina.

Electoral history

2020

2018

2016

2014

Committee assignments

2021-2022 Session
Appropriations
Appropriations - Justice and Public Safety
Agriculture 
Judiciary II 
Redistricting 
Rules, Calendar, and Operations of the House

2019-2020 Session
Appropriations 
Appropriations - Justice and Public Safety 
Agriculture 
Judiciary
Redistricting 
Rules, Calendar, and Operations of the House 
Education - Community Colleges

2017-2018 Session
Agriculture
Judiciary III (Vice Chair)
Rules, Calendar, and Operations of the House
Education - Community Colleges (Vice Chair)
Finance

2015-2016 Session
Agriculture
Judiciary II
Rules, Calendar, and Operations of the House
Education - Community Colleges (Vice-Chair)
Finance
Homeland Security, Military, and Veterans Affairs

References

|-

1970 births
21st-century American politicians
Living people
Democratic Party members of the North Carolina House of Representatives
People from Chatham County, North Carolina
People from Sanford, North Carolina
University of North Carolina at Chapel Hill alumni